The Burden Is Mine... Alone is an EP by the Norwegian progressive metal band Green Carnation, released in October 2005 by Profound Lore Records.

Background 
The EP would be an indicator of the stylistic shift the band planned for their next album, The Acoustic Verses. The EP and following album are very different from the usual dark mood that the band's older releases have.

This all out acoustic release has a lighter tone, and is a larger stylistic shift for the band. The EP also contains two tracks that were not included in the 2006 album, The Acoustic Verses.

Track listing
 "The Burden Is Mine... Alone" (Sordal) − 3:14
 "Sweet Leaf" − 5:04 (Schei)
 "Transparent Me" − (Jacksonville) – 4:44
 "Six Ribbons" (Jon English cover)	− 3:10

Personnel
 Stein Roger Sordal − Bass guitar, EBow, lead vocals, backing vocals
 Terje Vik Schei a.k.a. Tchort − Acoustic guitar
 Kjetil Nordhus − lead vocals, backing vocals
 Tommy Jacksonville − drums, percussion
 Michael Krumins − acoustic guitar, semi-acoustic guitar, theremin
 Kenneth Silden − piano, rhodes, strings, mellotron

External links
 Official Green Carnation Website
 "Profound Lore Records" Website

Green Carnation albums
2005 EPs
Profound Lore Records EPs